Home James! is a British television sitcom which aired from 1987 to 1990, starring comedian Jim Davidson, who played the role of Jim London. The show was a sequel to the sitcom, Up the Elephant and Round the Castle. The show was made for the ITV network by Thames Television.

Plot 
Jim London (Jim Davidson) is a working class cockney lad who lands a job as a chauffeur for businessman Robert Palmer (George Sewell) who has had his driving licence withdrawn. Palmer's butler (Harry Towb) doesn't approve of Jim but gradually accepts him.

Cast

Episodes 

25 episodes were aired over 4 series.

References

External links 

1980s British sitcoms
1990s British sitcoms
1987 British television series debuts
1990 British television series endings
ITV sitcoms
English-language television shows
Television shows set in London
Television shows produced by Thames Television